Russell Craig Mael (born October 5, 1948) is an American singer best known as the lead singer for the band Sparks which he formed in 1966 with his elder brother Ron Mael. Mael is known for his wide vocal range, in particular his far-reaching falsetto. He has a flamboyant and hyperactive stage presence which contrasts sharply with Ron Mael's inexpressive demeanour. The band released an album with British rock band Franz Ferdinand, as the supergroup FFS, titled FFS, released in 2015. The Mael brothers are the founders of Lil' Beethoven Records.

Early life 
Russell Craig Mael was born on October 5, 1948, in Los Angeles, California. The Mael brothers grew up in Pacific Palisades – a relatively affluent suburb of Los Angeles – with their father Meyer, who was a graphic designer and caricaturist for the Hollywood Citizen-News, and their mother, Miriam (née Moskowitz), a librarian. Both Meyer and Miriam were the children of Jewish immigrants, Meyer of Austrian and Russian descent and Miriam Polish; despite this, a source affiliated with the brothers' 2021 documentary stated that they "weren't raised, nor do they identify as Jewish", and the documentary does not mention their Jewish heritage. Much of the Mael brother's inspiration came from their father taking them to the cinema as children, where they developed an interest in film, visual arts and narrative. Meyer died when Mael was 8.

After graduating from Palisades High School, both brothers enrolled at UCLA; Ron began a course in cinema and graphic arts in 1963 while Russell studied theatre arts and filmmaking during 1966–1968.

Sparks 

Mael is known for his wide vocal range, and his most notable vocal trait is a far-reaching falsetto. An NME review described Russell's vocal range as a "stratospheric blend of Marc Bolan and Tiny Tim". 

He has recorded 24 albums with his band, Sparks. The band has a cult following around the world and are best known for the song "This Town Ain't Big Enough for Both of Us", which reached No. 2 on the UK Singles Chart.

The pair appeared as themselves in the 1977 disaster film Rollercoaster, performing live. They also appeared in episode 22 of season 6 of Gilmore Girls. Mael appeared in a cameo as a gallows singer in the 2018 Western Damsel, and both he and Ron appear as themselves in Annette, a musical film directed by Leos Carax that they wrote and composed.

In June 2018, Edgar Wright announced he would be making a documentary on Sparks. He had covered the band's concert in London in May at O2 Forum Kentish Town. This concert would also be a part of the documentary. The film, The Sparks Brothers, had its world premiere at the 2021 Sundance Film Festival on January 30, 2021.

Personal life 
In 2017, a reviewer noted that while the brothers' biographies recount a Los Angeles childhood in which they surfed and were both models for mail order catalogues, their private lives are otherwise almost entirely unknown. "Well, we're in good company with Bob Dylan", was their reported response. "We feel the less you do know, it keeps the mythology and the image in a better position." Even to the question of whether they have partners or spouses, they refused to give an indication, insisting that "the vagueness is more interesting than the reality."

It was, however, mentioned in Edgar Wright's 2021 documentary The Sparks Brothers that Russell dated Miss Christine of The GTOs, and had a brief fling with the Go-Go's member Jane Wiedlin, who was an additional vocalist on the Sparks track "Cool Places".

Discography 
With Sparks

With FFS

References

External links 
Official Sparks website

Mini biographical site
Sparks – The "Kimono My House" album files
Interview: Russell Mael "Two Hands, One Mouth, All Genius" Rockerzine.com

20th-century American singers
21st-century American singers
American male songwriters
American male pop singers
Record producers from California
Countertenors
Living people
Male new wave singers
Musicians from Santa Monica, California
Songwriters from California
Sparks (band) members
Synth-pop singers
UCLA Film School alumni
1948 births
20th-century American male singers
21st-century American male singers
FFS (band) members
American expatriates in the United Kingdom
American expatriates in France